Mićun Jovanić (29 July 1952 – 26 July 2010) was a Croatian footballer best known for his 12-year spell with Hajduk Split, where he played between 1969 and 1981. Later in his career Jovanić also played for Belgian side Anderlecht and lower level sides AS Béziers in France and Solin in Croatia.

Playing career

Club
He was one of the most consistent members of Hajduk's golden generation which dominated Yugoslav football in the 1970s and won four Yugoslav First League championships and five Yugoslav Cup titles. Because of this, Jovanić is one of the three most decorated Hajduk players in the history of the club (along with Dražen Mužinić and Luka Peruzović). Throughout his career Jovanić had appeared in 210 league matches and scored 27 league goals for Hajduk.

International
Unlike many of his teammates from that era who went on to become regular Yugoslav internationals (such as Jurica Jerković, Ivica Šurjak, Slaviša Žungul and Dražen Mužinić), Jovanić was never capped for the national team, although he did appear 4 times for Yugoslavia at youth levels.

Managerial career
After retiring from playing in 1985 Jovanić had several managing spells at lower level Croatian sides, including a 1991 spell with RNK Split and two spells at Segesta.

Personal life

Death
In early July 2010 the Croatian media reported that Jovanić had been diagnosed with pancreatic cancer and that a fundraising campaign was launched to raise some 20,000 euros for his treatment abroad. In spite of the successful fundraiser, Jovanić died on the night between 25 and 26 July 2010 at his home in Kaštel Gomilica near Split.

Honours
Yugoslav First League (4): 1970–71, 1973–74, 1974–75, 1978–79
Yugoslav Cup (5): 1972, 1973, 1974, 1976, 1977

References

External links
Biography of Mićun Jovanić at Hajduk Split official website 
 

1952 births
2010 deaths
Footballers from Split, Croatia
Croatian people of Serbian descent
Association football forwards
Yugoslav footballers
HNK Hajduk Split players
R.S.C. Anderlecht players
NK Solin players
AS Béziers Hérault (football) players
Yugoslav First League players
Belgian Pro League players
Ligue 2 players
Yugoslav expatriate footballers
Expatriate footballers in Belgium
Yugoslav expatriate sportspeople in Belgium
Expatriate footballers in France
Yugoslav expatriate sportspeople in France
Croatian football managers
RNK Split managers
HNK Segesta managers
Deaths from pancreatic cancer